Emmi Rakkolainen (born 9 August 1996) is a Finnish ice hockey player and member of the Finnish national team, currently serving as captain of Kiekko-Espoo Naiset in the Naisten Liiga (NSML).

Rakkolainen was officially named to the Finnish roster for the 2020 IIHF Women's World Championship on 4 March 2020, prior to the IIHF canceling the tournament on 7 March 2020 in response to public health concerns related to COVID-19. The 2020 World Championship would have been Rakkolainen's debut with the Finnish women's national team at an IIHF-organized international tournament, though she previously represented Finland at select tournaments in the Euro Hockey Tour during the 2018–19 and 2019–20 seasons.

References

External links 
 

Living people
1996 births
Espoo Blues Naiset players
Finnish women's ice hockey forwards
Ice hockey people from Helsinki
Kiekko-Espoo Naiset players